The Uinkaret volcanic field is an area of monogenetic volcanoes in northwestern Arizona, United States, located on the north rim of the Grand Canyon.

Lava flows from the Uinkaret volcanic field that have cascaded down into the Grand Canyon, damming the Colorado River, have been used to date the canyon's carving.  One of these cascades is today's Lava Falls. Lava Falls Rapid, below Lava Falls on the Colorado River, is "at all water levels, the most severe rapid in Grand Canyon."

The Colorado River was dammed by lava flows multiple times from 725,000 to 100,000 years ago. While some believe that these lava dams were stable, lasting up to 20,000 years and forming large reservoirs,  others think they failed quickly and catastrophically as massive floods.  Lava flows traveled downriver 76 miles (121 km) from river mile 178 to 254.

One lava flow, from Little Springs, south of Pliocene Mount Trumbull, has a cosmogenic helium age of 1300 +/- 500 years BP.

Notable Vents

See also
 Geology of the Grand Canyon area
 List of volcanoes in the United States

References

External links 
 Uinkaret Volcanic Field, Western Grand Canyon, Arizona at Volcano World
 Full-size version of image in infobox, NASA ASTER satellite image.

Volcanic fields of Arizona
Grand Canyon, North Rim
Pleistocene volcanism
Landforms of Mohave County, Arizona
Monogenetic volcanic fields
Grand Canyon, North Rim (west)